Guillermo Leon Pujadas (born 6 February 1997) is a Uruguayan rugby union player who generally plays as a hooker represents Uruguay internationally.When he was young he played for [Club Champagnat], the best club of rugby in Uruguay.  He was included in the Uruguayan squad for the 2019 Rugby World Cup which was held in Japan for the first time and also marked his first World Cup appearance.

Career 
He made his international debut for Uruguay against Fiji on 17 November 2018.

References 

1997 births
Living people
Uruguayan rugby union players
Uruguay international rugby union players
Rugby union hookers
Rugby union players from Montevideo
Peñarol Rugby players